Frederick William Donnelly (October 14, 1866 – September 25, 1935) was an  American Democratic politician who served as Mayor of Trenton, New Jersey from 1911 until 1932.

Biography
Donnelly was born on October 14, 1866 in Trenton to Richard Grant Augustus Donnelly and Susan Davisson. The actress Ruth Donnelly was his niece.

Donnelly attended Trenton public schools and the State Model School. He later attended the Episcopal School in Burlington, New Jersey and studied at the Rider Business College (now Rider University). He worked for several years as  a traveling salesman for a New York wholesale clothing business before returning to Trenton and assuming management of his father's clothing store.

Donnelly became mayor in 1911 when the first city commission was organized. He was reelected every four years until 1931. The following year he resigned as mayor due to health reasons and was succeeded by George B. Labarre.
 
While mayor he advocated deeper waterways and served as president of the Trenton-Philadelphia-New York Deeper Waterways Association, which he organized. In 1924 he was the Democratic nominee for United States Senate, losing to the Republican incumbent, Walter Evans Edge.

In 1935 he died at a hospital in Summit, New Jersey at the age of 69.

References

External links
Biographical information for Frederick W. Donnelly from The Political Graveyard

1866 births
1935 deaths
Rider University alumni
New Jersey Democrats
Mayors of Trenton, New Jersey